Eleshnitsa is a village in Razlog Municipality, in Blagoevgrad Province, Bulgaria.

References

Villages in Blagoevgrad Province